The 2001 World Weightlifting Championships were held in Antalya, Turkey.

Medal summary

Men

Women

Medal table
Ranking by Big (Total result) medals 

Ranking by all medals: Big (Total result) and Small (Snatch and Clean & Jerk)

Team ranking

Men

Women

Participating nations
267 competitors from 53 nations competed.

 (2)
 (2)
 (6)
 (2)
 (2)
 (8)
 (4)
 (1)
 (10)
 (3)
 (8)
 (1)
 (11)
 (7)
 (9)
 (2)
 (4)
 (3)
 (1)
 (1)
 (2)
 (1)
 (5)
 (2)
 (4)
 (5)
 (14)
 (11)
 (14)
 (10)
 (4)
 (2)
 (4)
 (6)
 (8)
 (3)
 (1)
 (1)
 (2)
 (5)
 (10)
 (3)
 (3)
 (15)
 (2)
 (2)
 (9)
 (2)
 (2)
 (15)
 (6)
 (1)
 (6)

References
 
 

 
World Weightlifting Championships
2001 in Turkish sport
International weightlifting competitions hosted by Turkey
2001 in weightlifting
Weightliftimg
November 2001 sports events in Turkey